Freshwater Lifeboat Station is owned and operated by the Freshwater Independent Lifeboat Service located in the village of Freshwater on the Isle of Wight in the United Kingdom. The organisation operates two lifeboats and is on call to the Coast Guard 24 hours a day, 365 days a year. The station covers an area up to 30 miles off shore from Hurst Point to St Catherine's point. The service is not part of the RNLI and do not receive funding from the RNLI or the government.

See also 
 Independent lifeboats (British Isles)

References 

Lifeboat stations on the Isle of Wight
Organisations based on the Isle of Wight
Independent Lifeboat stations